Vidya Avinash Arankalle (born 1952) is an Indian virologist whose work is multidisciplinary, incorporating aspects of cell culture and microbiology.

Life
She is a fellow of the Indian National Science Academy, and the Indian Academy of Sciences.

Selected works

References

External links
http://www.scititles.com/researcher-info/35766

Women virologists
Living people
1952 births
Indian women microbiologists
Indian virologists